Copiula is a genus of microhylid frogs endemic to New Guinea. The common name Mehely frogs has been coined for them. They are leaf-litter inhabitants.

Taxonomy
Copiula is probably not monophyletic. Some former Austrochaperina species have already been transferred to this genus, and further ones might follow when more data became available.

Species
There are at present 14 species in this genus:

The AmphibiaWeb reports fewer species, with species that Peloso and colleagues moved in 2016 from Austrochaperina and Oxydactyla missing.

References

 
Microhylidae
Amphibians of Oceania
Amphibians of New Guinea
Amphibian genera
Taxa named by Lajos Méhelÿ
Endemic fauna of New Guinea